Marks Tey railway station is on the Great Eastern Main Line (GEML) in the East of England, serving the village of Marks Tey, Essex. Its three-letter station code is MKT. The "up" (London-bound) platform 1 has an operational length for nine-coach trains, the "down" (Colchester-bound) platform 2 can accommodate 11-coach trains and platform 3 (for the Sudbury branch) has an operational length for two-coach trains.

The station was opened in 1843 by the Eastern Counties Railway. It is located on Station Road, just off the A120 road that runs through the village, parallel to the railway. The station is currently operated by Greater Anglia, who also operate all trains serving it, as part of the East Anglia franchise.

History
The station opened in 1843 for services on the Great Eastern Main Line, and the Sudbury branch line followed in 1849. From that date until 1889 the station was known as Marks Tey Junction. The branch line is only accessible to trains travelling from  "up" towards London.

The opening of the Colne Valley and Halstead Railway off the Sudbury branch in 1860 and the extension of the branch beyond Sudbury via the Stour Valley Railway in 1865 to  added importance to Marks Tey as a junction, allowing through-trains from Colchester.

These passenger services were gradually cut back and the closure of the Sudbury to Cambridge link in March 1967 saw the end of through running.

An 1897 survey shows sidings on the "up" side at the Colchester end of the main line platform but the main concentration of sidings including a goods shed and a turntable are on the "down" side at the Colchester end primarily servicing the branch line.

Accidents and incidents
On 29 December 1906, 34 people sustained minor injuries in a collision between two portions of a split passenger train at Marks Tey. As the main portion of the 5:30 pm service from London Liverpool Street to  came to an unscheduled stop at the station, the rear portion had been erroneously detached from the front section and crashed into the rear of it at low speed.
On 12 June 2008, a freight train was partially derailed at Marks Tey due to a track defect, causing minor injury to its two crew members. As it passed through the station at 2:05 pm two wheelsets on one of the wagons were derailed, also causing damage to the rolling stock and to infrastructure.

Services

All services are operated by Greater Anglia.

References

External links

Station pictures and facilities from Marks Tey Rail Users' Association

Railway stations in Essex
DfT Category D stations
Former Great Eastern Railway stations
Railway stations in Great Britain opened in 1843
Greater Anglia franchise railway stations
1843 establishments in England